Vicente Cosentino was an Argentine cinematographer, photographer and cameraman who worked on over 40 films produced in the Argentina in the 1950s and 1960s.

Cosentino began working in film in 1949 and Al compás de tu mentira was one of his earliest films, working in over 40 films over a twenty-year period, retiring from film in 1969.

Filmography
 The New Bell (1950)
 The Honourable Tenant (1951)

External links
 

Year of birth missing
Argentine cinematographers
Possibly living people